Antonio Baldellou-Esteva (born 8 November 1981), also known as Tony Baldellou-Esteva, is a Spanish tennis coach and former professional player. Most recently, as of 2020, he is coaching Slovenian player Kaja Juvan.

A Barcelona native, Baldellou-Esteva reached a career high singles ranking of 431 in the world, competing in satellite, Futures and Challenger events. In 2001 he had a win over Rafael Nadal in the qualifying draw of a satellite tournament in Balaguer. His only Challenger title came in doubles at Kranj in 2006.

Challenger/Futures titles

Singles

Doubles

References

External links
 
 

1981 births
Living people
Spanish male tennis players
Tennis players from Barcelona